The West India Committee is a British-based organisation promoting ties and trade with the British Caribbean. It operates as a charity and NGO (non-governmental organisation). It evolved out of a lobbying group formed in 1780 to represent the interests of the plantocracy.

Historically, the principal commodities of the region were cane sugar, rum, mahogany, other softwood, spices and tropical produce, early on largely confined to types that would last a long transatlantic voyage such as coffee, nuts and desiccated coconut but later expanded to include tropical fruits in general.

London Society of West India Planters and Merchants

The London Society of West India Planters and Merchants was established to represent the views of the British West Indian plantocracy. The organisation played a major role in resisting the abolition of the slave trade and that of slavery itself.

The Society was formed in 1780, and brought together three different groups: British sugar merchants, absentee plantation owners and colonial agents. (See Sugar plantations in the Caribbean.) The society started with a predominantly Jamaican leadership, but as emancipation approached, by the 1830s the leadership came to include a broader ranger of planter interests from across the British Caribbean.

The society evolved into the West India Committee.

West India Committee
In 1904, the committee received a royal charter of incorporation at the initiative of the British government.  It later acquired charitable status and established two subsidiary bodies: 
The Caribbean Council for Europe (CCE)
The Caribbean Trade Advisory Group (Caritag).

Among its records are, for example, eight collections of Caribbean and English newspapers 1761–1846, reports of the Acting Committee to the Half-Yearly Meeting of the Standing Committee of West India Planters and Merchants, 1878–1883, and albums of photographs and press cuttings on the 1907 Kingston earthquake in Jamaica, a country that was a major subject of its promotion work.

The modern organisation
The West India Committee exists to promote and support agriculture, manufacturing, and trade in the  West Indies, Guyana and Belize,  "to increase the general welfare of the people of those territories and their global diaspora through education, training, acting as an advocate, adviser and where necessary, as an umbrella organisation". It seeks to bring Caribbean businesses to the attention of the world's major markets.

The Chief Executive is Blondel Cluff CBE, who is also the Anguilla government's representative in the United Kingdom.

Notable officers
From at least 1915 until 1929, its Secretary was Algernon Aspinall, who, in the name of his committee, published geographical guides to Guyana and the British Caribbean, such as a 1907 Stanford's Guide: Pocket Guide to the West Indies and The Handbook of the British West Indies, British Guiana and British Honduras (1929).

Sir Eliot de Pass served first as an ordinary member of the Committee, then as its chairman from 1925 to 1936, and finally as president until his death the following year.

Archives
The Society's minute books were purchased by the government of Trinidad and Tobago. They are currently held at the Alma Jordan Library, at the University of the West Indies, St. Augustine.

References

External links 

1780 establishments in England
Charities based in the United Kingdom
Lobbying in the United Kingdom
Organisations based in the Caribbean
Planters from the British West Indies